This is an alphabetical list of countries by past and projected Gross Domestic Product per capita, based on the Purchasing Power Parity (PPP) methodology, not on official exchange rates. Values are given in USDs. These figures have been taken from the International Monetary Fund's World Economic Outlook (WEO) Database, October 2022 edition.

IMF estimates between 1980 and 1989

IMF estimates between 1990 and 1999

IMF estimates between 2000 and 2009

IMF estimates between 2010 and 2019

IMF projections for 2020 through 2027

See also
List of countries by GDP (PPP) per capita
List of countries by GDP (PPP) per capita growth rate

References

Sources

External links
IMF website
2022 World Economic Outlook (WEO) Database
Archive of the WEO databases, from 1999 to 2011

GDP (PPP) Past and Projected